Alois Josef, Freiherr von Schrenk und Nötzig (24 March 1802 – 5 March 1849) was the Roman Catholic archbishop of Prague from 1838 to 1849.

Biography
Schrenk was born in Zbenice in 1802 with the hereditary title of Freiherr von Schrenk und Nötzig. He was ordained a priest in 1825. On 12 February 1838, he was appointed auxiliary bishop of Olomouc in the Czech Republic, as well as titular bishop of Ptolemais in Phoenicia. On 20 June 1838, Schrenk was appointed archbishop of Prague (called Prince Archbishop), was confirmed on 17 September 1838, and subsequently installed on 4 November 1838. 

Schrenk invited the French congregation of the Sisters of Mercy of St. Borromeo to  Prague. They established a hospital and nursing school on Petřín Hill below the Strahov Garden. The Prague community was confirmed as a separate congregation in 1841 and soon became one of the most numerous and most significant orders in Bohemia.

On 5 March 1849, he died at the age of 46, having been a bishop for 10 years.

The 1911 Catholic Encyclopedia makes mention of Schrenk in its entry for Prague:

References and notes

External links
Archbishop Alois Josef Schrenk profile at Catholic-Hierarchy

1802 births
1849 deaths
Roman Catholic archbishops in the Austrian Empire
19th-century Czech people
Roman Catholic archbishops of Prague
Bohemian nobility
German Bohemian people
People from Příbram District